Illinois Route 192 is a  east–west state highway in northwest Illinois. It runs from its western terminus at Illinois Route 92 northwest of Edgington to its eastern terminus at Illinois Route 94 in Taylor Ridge. The route is located entirely within Rock Island County. Route 192 is maintained by the Illinois Department of Transportation (IDOT).

Route description 
Route 192 primarily serves as a connector road between Route 92 and Route 94 southwest of Rock Island. The route's western terminus is a three-way junction with Route 92 northwest of Edgington. Route 192 heads south from this intersection as 175th Street before turning westward and becoming 134th Street. The highway enters the unincorporated community of Edgington and passes Rockridge High School. After leaving Edgington, the route continues eastward into Taylor Ridge, where it reaches its eastern terminus at a three-way intersection with Route 94. Route 192 is an undivided, two-lane surface road for its entire length.

History 
The road which is now Route 192 was constructed under the State Bond Issue bill of 1924 as part of Illinois Route 84, which was originally designated from the state line at Muscatine, Iowa to Taylor Ridge. The route was first included on Illinois highway maps in 1924. It was marked on state maps as part of Route 84 in 1929 and briefly became part of Illinois Route 2 in 1938. In 1939, IL 92 replaced part of IL 2 between Muscatine, Iowa and Rock Island. Route 92 was realigned to the north in 1955, and Route 192 was designated on its former alignment from west of Edgington to U.S. Route 67. The route originally formed a concurrency with Route 94 from Route 192's present eastern terminus to US 67. Route 192 was shortened to its present length by 1999.

Major intersections

References

External links
Illinois Highway Ends: Illinois Route 192
Illinois Highways Page: Routes 181 thru 200

192
Transportation in Rock Island County, Illinois